Broughton Park RUFC, is one of the oldest rugby union clubs in England and was established in 1882, just one year after the Lancashire County Rugby Football Union was founded and eleven years after the formation of the national Rugby Football Union. The first XV plays in North 1 West, a sixth level league in the English league system following their promotion as champions of South Lancs/Cheshire 1 at the end of the 2017-18 season.

History
Broughton Park was established in 1882 and despite this early beginning was the third Broughton based rugby club, after Broughton RUFC (1862) and Broughton Rangers (1877). The club was overshadowed in terms of international representation by its two neighbours for the first decade of its existence. In 1919, just after the First World War, it started to make a mark on the national scene with A M Crook becoming both the Lancashire Union president and also being elected to the presidency of the Rugby Football Union. J E Kidd was elected Lancashire president in 1930 and it was not until the 1960s that Broughton once again came to the fore. The glory days of the club were in the 1960s and 1970s and at one point they fielded four internationals on the pitch. In this period they also had two more Lancashire presidents and in 1981 in John Burgess they had a president of the Rugby Football Union. Broughton Park were never able to recapture the heights of this period, and in the professional era have not managed to reach the top flight.

Club honours
Courage National Division 4 North champions: 1989–90
South Lancs/Cheshire 1 champions (2): 2005–06, 2017–18
North Lancashire/Cumbria v South Lancs/Cheshire 1 promotion playoff winners: 2012–13

Ground
The club has had a number of different grounds in its time, mainly in the Salford/Prestwich areas, but also in the south of Manchester. Since 2004 its present new facility is at Hough End in Chorlton-cum-Hardy, Manchester. Football club Salford City F.C.'s stadium, Moor Lane, was once the club's home ground. It is located in the Kersal Moor area of Salford, close to the boundary with Prestwich.

Representation
Originally the club had only one senior side, but now fields five senior sides (4 male and 1 female) and supported by one Colts (U19), four youth (U13-U17) and six mini (U6-U12) teams; a total involvement of some 330 players each week. Broughton Park R.F.C. is the City of Manchester's highest placed representative in the Rugby Union Leagues.

Notable players

International honours
Tony Neary, former England Captain, and British Lion.
Kevin O'Brien, Ireland, Barbarians and Rest of the World team.
Barry Jackson, Captain of Lancashire and England International.
Mike Leadbetter, England International.
Tony Bond, England Under 23 caps and full England International.
Bert 'HB' Toft, England Captain, Lancashire.
Dan Scarbrough, England International
Raffi Quirke, England International

Other notable former players
Alan Shuker, England Trialist, Barbarians and President of Lancashire RFU.
Ron Greenall, Lancashire, Cheshire, North of England and England Trialist and Peter Barratt, England Trialist.
John Burgess, England Coach and former President of the Rugby Football Union.
Simon Verbickas, North of England U21 and England U21.
Andy O'Grady, North of England U21.
Jimmy Wilde, England Colts and a Barbarian
Jim Sydall, in the North team which beat the All Blacks 20 points to 9 at Otley in November 1979.
John Russell, England Colts
Andy Taylor, England Colts
Gary Jones, England Colts
David Tait England Schools U17 International 2003.
Jason Duffy England Schools U18 International 2003.
Simon McIntyre England U18 International 2009.Sale Sharks 2009-2011 and Wasps 2011-2021.
Bill Bevan and Glyn Parry, - co-founders of Manchester Schools Rugby Football Union
Jamie Harrison North Of England U20 and England Counties U20 2011
Alan Buckley, rugby league centre with Swinton, Lancashire and Great Britain
Michael Woodhouse, New Zealand Member of Parliament and Deputy Leader of the House

Presidents of Lancashire RFU
 1919/23  A M Crook
 1930/32  J E Kidd 
 1963/64  V G Funduklian 
 1970/71  A Shuker  
 1981/82  J Burgess
 1985/86  W G Bevan  
 1986/87  Dr J E Ryner

Presidents of the Rugby Football Union
 1919/23  A M Crook
 1981/82  J Burgess

References

External links
 Official website

English rugby union teams
Rugby clubs established in 1882
1882 establishments in England
Rugby union in Greater Manchester
Organisations based in Manchester